Mljet is the southernmost and easternmost of the larger Adriatic islands of the Dalmatia region of Croatia. The National Park includes the western part of the island, Veliko jezero, Malo jezero, Soline Bay and a sea belt 500 metres wide from the most prominent cape of Mljet covering an area of 54 km2. The central parts of the park are Veliko jezero with the Isle of St. Mary, Malo jezero and the villages of Goveđari, Polače, and Pomena.

Population
According to the 2011 census, Mljet has population of 1,088. Ethnic Croats make up 97.33% of the population.

History
Mljet was discovered by ancient Greco-Roman geographers, who wrote the first records and descriptions. The island was first described by Scylax of Caryanda in the 6th century BC; others prefer the text, Periplus of Pseudo-Scylax. In both texts, it is named Melite and supported by Apollonius of Rhodes. Agathemerus and Pliny the Elder call the island Melita.

Agesilaus of Anaxarba in Cilicia, the father of Oppian, was banished to Mljet by the Roman Emperor Septimius Severus (AD 145–211) (or to Malta by Lucius Verus: see Oppian).
.

Mljet is mentioned around 950 by the Byzantine Emperor Constantine VII Porphyrogenitos in his Of Ruling an Empire as one of the islands held by the Narentines. The island was often a controversy of ownership between them and Zachlumia. Ancient Greeks called the island "Melita" or "honey" which over the centuries evolved to become the Slavic name, Mljet.

Mljet has been regarded as the "Melita" on which Saint Paul was shipwrecked (Acts of the Apostles 27:39–28:11), this view being first expounded in the 10th century, by Eastern Roman Emperor Constantine Porphyrogenitus. Saint Paul's shipwreck is generally placed on the Mediterranean island of Malta. Mljet and Malta had the same name in the Greek and Roman sources; the mention of a viper in Acts 28:3–5 was thought to be in favour of Mljet (there are snakes on both Mljet and Malta but only the former is home to a venomous snake). A harbour named after the Saint exists on both islands.

The Benedictines from Pulsano in Apulia became the feudal lords of the island in 1151, having come from Monte Gargano in Italy. They came ashore in the Sutmiholjska cove and in 1187–1198 the Serbian Prince Desa of the House of Vojislavljević built and donated to them the Church and Monastery of Saint Mary on the islet in the Big Lake (Veliko Jezero) towards the north-west end of the island. Pope Innocent III issued a document consecrating the church in 1198.

The Benedictines renounced their rule over Mljet in 1345, keeping only a third of the land. The island got a statute and a municipality in Babino Polje. It was formally annexed by the Republic of Ragusa in 1410. According to the Contract with the Benedictines, the municipality had to pay 300 perpers each year.

In the 16th century, the monastery was the center of the Mljet Congregation (Congregatio Melitensis or Melitana), gathering all the monasteries of Benedictine monks in the area of the Republic of Ragusa. The first president of the Congregation was Mavro Vetranović, the abbot of the Mljet monastery and the famous poet. Another great poet was abbot there—Ignjat Đurđević in the 18th century. As time went by, the Benedictine monastery on Mljet lost its importance, while the seat of the Mljet Congregation moved to Sveti Jakov near Ragusa.

In 1809, during the rule of Napoleon, the Mljet monastery was disbanded. When Austria took over the island, it placed the forestry office in the building. Between the world wars, the building was owned by the Ragusa (Dubrovnik) Bishopric. In 1960 it became a hotel, and in 1998 it was returned to the bishopric. The island has a long history of eco-damage. In order to ease their transport problems, the monks dug a channel to the south coast, from the lake Veliko Jezero, thus turning both fresh-water lakes into seawater-based ones.

The second incident involves mongooses. Small Indian mongooses were introduced onto the island in the early 20th century in order to reduce the venomous snake population (the island was apparently completely overrun). Whilst the mongooses completed this task, they also disposed of pretty much all the birdlife of the island. To this day, the island is notably short of hedgerow birds, such as sparrows. Mongooses are a hazard for domestic poultry, and are also known to cause damage in vineyards and orchards.

Geography

Mljet lies south of the Pelješac peninsula, from which it is divided by the Mljet Channel. It is of volcanic origin, with numerous chasms and gorges, of which the longest, the Babino Polje, connects the north and south of the island. Port Polače, the principal harbour in the north, is a port of call for tourist ferries. Mljet contains one hotel—The Odisej (from the Greek Odysseus) in the north-west corner of the island.

The northwestern part of the island includes an inland lake as well as a small island within it. It has been a national park since November 12, 1960. The island's geological structure consists of limestone and dolomite forming ridges, crests and slopes. A few depressions on the island of Mljet are below sea level and form non-permanent brackish lakes known as blatine ("mud-lakes") or slatine ("salt-lakes").

The climate is Mediterranean; an average air temperature in January is 9 °C (48 °F) and in July about 24 °C (75 °F). Precipitation (mostly falling between October and April) averages between 35 and 45 inches annually, with the hills receiving the highest amounts.

Settlements
According to the 2011 census, the settlements of Mljet have the following population:
Babino Polje (270): largest settlement, police station, school
Goveđari (151)
Babine Kuće
Pristanište
Soline
Pomena (52)
Polače (113): ferry port, Roman ruins
Blato (39)
Ropa (37): auto camp
Kozarica (28)
Sobra (131): ferry port
Prožura (40)
Prožurska Luka (40)
Maranovići (43)
Okuklje (31)
Korita (46)
Saplunara (67): beach

Transportation
The island of Mljet has no airport. Dubrovnik Airport on the mainland provides the main international connection for the island. Mljet has ferry lines with Pelješac peninsula and Dubrovnik. Transportation to the island is provided by Jadrolinija ferry service. Sobra, the main port on the island, is connected to Dubrovnik-Gruž and Ston via a car ferry. There are two type of ferries available: a car ferry and a faster catamaran ferry (2.5 hours and 90 minutes to Dubrovnik, respectively).

The two-lane paved road runs throughout the island. Scheduled buses on Mljet travel just once or twice a day.

See also 
Meleda disease

References

External links

Island of Mljet
Mljet National Park Guide
Mljet Travel Guide

 
Landforms of Dubrovnik-Neretva County
Forests of Croatia
Islands of Croatia
Islands of the Adriatic Sea
Municipalities of Croatia
National parks of Croatia
Protected areas of Dubrovnik-Neretva County